CSKA Ice Palace is an indoor arena that is located in Moscow, Russia. The arena's current seating capacity is 5,600. The arena is located next to Khodynka Field, and is a part of the CSKA Sports Complex. It is primarily used to host ice hockey games and figure skating competitions.

History
Originally built in 1964, CSKA Ice Palace was heavily renovated and expanded in 1991, and expanded again in 2006. It has been used as the long-time home arena for the ice hockey games of CSKA Moscow.

External links
CSKA Ice Palace at HC CSKA Moscow official site 
Info on the arena. peski.ru
More info. sports.ru

Indoor ice hockey venues in Russia
Indoor arenas in Russia
Sports venues in Moscow
HC CSKA Moscow
Sports venues built in the Soviet Union
Sports venues completed in 1964
Sports venues completed in 1991
Kontinental Hockey League venues
1964 establishments in the Soviet Union
CSKA Moscow